Monroe Community Hospital is a chronic-care center in Rochester
 that is operated by Monroe County. They also have a Skilled Nursing Facility

History

The nonprofit 566-bed hospital's roots can be traced to the 1933-built Monroe Community Home and Infirmary, which was a replacement for the 1820s-built Monroe County Almshouse. The Community Home structure "was designed by local architect Sigmund Firestone."
 Firestone employed Thomas Wilson Boyde Jr. (1905-1981), who later became "Rochester's first Black architect." Boyde's "decorative architectural elements added to" Firestone's design.

Some of the 190-year-old facility's attending physicians are "affiliated with the University of Rochester's Strong Memorial Hospital."

Controversy
In 2017 a local newspaper headlined "Two lawsuits in a month against Monroe Community Hospital." They had publicly fired their director in 2013.

References

  

Hospitals in New York (state)
Brick buildings and structures
History of Rochester, New York